Bil Ḥadid  is a village in the District of Jabal al Akhdar in north-eastern Libya,  west of Bayda.

References

External links

Populated places in Jabal al Akhdar